Christopher D. Ryan (18 August 1957 – 8 February 2021) was an Irish Gaelic footballer, hurler and coach. As a dual player for club and county, he played in several positions including as a defensive centre-back, in midfield, or as a target man in attack. Ryan has been described as one of Cork's most decorated club players of all time.

Biography

Playing career
Ryan began his club career at underage level with St Finbarr's, winning minor and under-21 championships across both codes. He was just 18 years of age when he was drafted onto the club's senior teams in 1976 and began the first of seventeen consecutive seasons as a senior dual player. During that time, Ryan lined out in 20 county finals, winning six Cork SHC titles and five Cork SFC. He also won a combined total of six Munster Club Championships and four All-Ireland Club Championships, captaining "the Barr's" footballers to the title in 1980.

After an unsuccessful minor and under-21 career at inter-county level, Ryan joined the Cork senior football team in advance of the 1977-78 league. During a decade-long association with the team he served as captain on two occasions, a position he held for Cork's National League success in 1980 and their Munster Championship victory in 1983. Ryan, who also won a National League title with the Cork senior hurling team, ended his career with an All-Ireland final defeat by Meath in 1987.

Death
Ryan died in Glasheen on 8 February 2021, at the age of 63.

Honours
St Finbarr's
All-Ireland Senior Club Hurling Championship: 1978
All-Ireland Senior Club Football Championship: 1980 (c), 1981, 1987
Munster Senior Club Hurling Championship: 1978, 1980
Munster Senior Club Football Championship: 1979, 1980 (c), 1982, 1986
Cork Senior Hurling Championship: 1977, 1980, 1981, 1982, 1984, 1988
Cork Senior Football Championship: 1976, 1979, 1980 (c), 1982, 1985
Cork Under-21 Football Championship: 1977 (c), 1978 (c)
Cork Minor Hurling Championship: 1975
Cork Minor Football Championship: 1975

Cork
Munster Senior Football Championship: 1983 (c), 1987
National Football League: 1979-80 (c)
National Hurling League: 1979-80

Munster
Railway Cup: 1981, 1982

References

1957 births
2021 deaths
St Finbarr's Gaelic footballers
St Finbarr's hurlers
Cork inter-county hurlers
Cork inter-county Gaelic footballers
Dual players
Munster inter-provincial Gaelic footballers